The Nivaje Shale is a geologic group in Dominican Republic. It preserves coral fossils dating back to the Miocene period.

See also 
 List of fossiliferous stratigraphic units in the Dominican Republic

References

Further reading 
 S. D. Cairns and J. W. Wells. 1987. Neogene paleontology in the northern Dominican Republic, 5. The suborders Caryophylliina and Dendrophylliina (Anthozoa, Scleractinia). Bulletins of American Paleontology 93(328):23-43

Geologic formations of the Dominican Republic
Neogene Dominican Republic
Shale formations